"Calling Elvis" is a song written by Mark Knopfler and performed by Dire Straits. It first appeared on the final studio album by the band, On Every Street (1991). It was released as the first single from that album, peaking at number 21 in the United Kingdom, and reaching the Top 10 in numerous other countries. It was included on the 2005 compilation The Best of Dire Straits & Mark Knopfler: Private Investigations. A live version of the song also appears on the 1993 live album On the Night.

Content
The song is about an Elvis fan who believes Elvis Presley is still alive, making references to many of his songs, including "Heartbreak Hotel", "Love Me Tender", "Love Me (Treat Me Like a Fool)", "Don't Be Cruel" and "Return to Sender", as well as the expression "Elvis has left the building". Mark Knopfler has been quoted as saying the idea came to him one day when he left his phone off the hook and his brother-in-law tried repeatedly to get hold of him. Upon finally doing so, the brother-in-law remarked Mark was harder to get hold of than Elvis.

Music video
The music video was jointly directed by Gerry Anderson of Thunderbirds fame and Steve Barron. It includes several members of the band represented in marionette form, as well as various Thunderbirds characters and a woman.

Track listings
7-inch and cassette single
A. "Calling Elvis"
B. "Iron Hand"

12-inch and CD single
"Calling Elvis"
"Iron Hand"
"Millionaire Blues"

US 7-inch single and Japanese mini-CD single
A. "Calling Elvis" – 6:25
B. "Millionaire Blues" – 4:23

Charts

Weekly charts

Year-end charts

See also
List of European number-one airplay songs of the 1990s

References

1991 songs
1991 singles
Dire Straits songs
Songs about Elvis Presley
Songs written by Mark Knopfler
Song recordings produced by Mark Knopfler
Number-one singles in Italy